Abades “on Tenerife” is a small holiday resort located on the south-east coast from Tenerife, the largest of Spain’s Canary Islands, on the municipality of Arico, between Poris de Abona and La Jaca.

History

The leprosy station 

Leprosy once was considered a major disease on the island. A leprosy station was first built in the north of the island, where most of the local population lived. The bodies were thrown in the sea outside Santa Cruz until a crematorium was built. In 1943 a whole leprosy village was built on the hill above Abades, including an hospital, a crematorium, many bungalows, an administration’s building facing the sea, and the big concrete church, in typical Franco’s style with a huge cross on the top, that everyone can spot from the motorway. The project was never finished as leprosy was almost eradicated from the Canary Islands as advancements in medical treatments became available at the same time. The leprosy station became a military training facility but the whole place was sold to an Italian in 2002. The church is a ruin but still in good state.

From Los Abriguitos to Abades 

Abades is the result of a relatively recent development. The former villages were higher in the mountain at the edge of the natural forest usually where water could be obtained by digging gullies deep into the mountains to catch the water. Behind Abades “red mountain”, a small harbour, the “enseñada de Abades” which was primarily used to ship the red stones from the local quarry to other islands as far as Cuba as wells as for local fishermen. Goat keepers used to live in natural caves after the few winter rainfalls, then headed back to Arico during the long dry season. The lighthouse, halfway between Abades and Poris de Abona, was built in 1902 and replaced with a new tower in 1978. 1978 was a key-year for the development of this area with the opening of the Tenerife South Airport Reina Sofia and the connection through the Autopista TF-1. Between 1978 and 1986, this place was named “Los Abriguitos” and many wooden hutments were built to host the new tourists. In 1986, all wooden hutments were burnt and the Abades project started with a wall facing the sea. In 1987 the square and the small church were built, in 1988 the exit 18 on the motorway took its present shape, in 1993 the roads were covered with asphalt, and the tennis court and small park were finished.

Name changes 

 1943: Sanatorio de Abona 
 1978 – 1986: Los Abriguitos 
 Since 1986: Abades

Population 

A big majority of the 760+ small white bungalows are owned from Canarian people who live in the much wetter northern part of the island, some others are properties of senior German citizens who use them to spend the winter months on the island. Many of these bungalows are available to rent for long-term contracts as well as for short holidays. Most bungalows are built in a similar way, white walls and dark green windows and doors.

Tourism 

Abades is a very quiet place to stay during the winter, but warm weekends and school holidays bring a sudden rush of activity. This resort has nine restaurants / pubs available around the square and in the new buildings close to the sea; two small supermarkets, two real estate offices, a Boxing-  and a Fitness studio and a scuba diving centre which are open every day. Access to the beach is disabled-people friendly and a shower has been installed end of 2007.

Access 

The access to Abades is very easy thanks to the motorway, only 12 minutes drive from the Reina Sofia TFS airport, on the autopista TF-1 direction Santa Cruz, former exit 18; now km 42. The TITSA bus line has the following connections:

 111 connects Abades to the Los Cristianos / Playa de las Américas area as well as Santa Cruz de Tenerife
 115 connects to Las Galletas
 116 to El Medano 
 341 to the airport South Reina Sofia.
Neither 115 or 116 are currently in service

Sources 

 Domingo Martínez de la Peña y Gonzales (1991): Historia de Arico, 
 DVD "De Los Abriguitos a Abades" from the Ayuntamiento de Villa de Arico

Populated places in Tenerife